Duda Sanadze (born 25 July 1992) is a Georgian professional basketball player for BC Anorthosis of the Cyprus Basketball Division A.

Playing career 
In February 2021, Sanadze signed for Serbian team Borac Čačak. In May 2021, he signed a one-year contract extension.

National team career 
Sanadze has been a member of the Georgian national team since 2013.

References

External links
Liga Nova KBM profile
San Diego Toreros bio
Eurobasket link
Proballers bio

1992 births
Living people
ABA League players
Baloncesto Fuenlabrada players
BC Dinamo Tbilisi players
BC Rustavi players
Expatriate basketball people from Georgia (country) in Serbia
Expatriate basketball people from Georgia (country) in Spain
Expatriate basketball people from Georgia (country) in the United States
Expatriate basketball people from Georgia (country) in Italy
Expatriate basketball people from Georgia (country) in Portugal
Expatriate basketball people from Georgia (country) in Qatar
Expatriate basketball people from Georgia (country) in Cyprus
Expatriate basketball people from Georgia (country) in Slovenia
Gipuzkoa Basket players
KK Borac Čačak players
Liga ACB players
Lega Basket Serie A players
Men's basketball players from Georgia (country)
Pistoia Basket 2000 players
Rosa Radom players
San Diego Toreros men's basketball players
Small forwards
Basketball players from Tbilisi
Expatriate basketball people from Georgia (country) in Poland